The 13th Letter is a 1951 American film noir mystery film directed by Otto Preminger and starring Linda Darnell, Charles Boyer, Michael Rennie, and Constance Smith. The film is a remake of the French film Le Corbeau (The Raven, 1943) directed by Henri-Georges Clouzot.

Plot
Doctor Pearson (Michael Rennie), who works at a hospital in Quebec, Canada, receives a series of poison pen letters.  More letters, all signed with the mysterious picture of a feather, are delivered to others in the small Canadian town. Cora Laurent (Constance Smith), the wife of the main doctor - Dr. Laurent (Charles Boyer) - at the hospital, receives a letter accusing her of having an affair with Pearson. Another letter informs a shell-shocked veteran Mr. Gauthier that he is dying of cancer, causing the distraught man to commit suicide.  Quickly, the townsfolk begin pointing fingers at all possible suspects.

Cast
 Linda Darnell as Denise Tourneur
 Charles Boyer as Dr. Laurent
 Michael Rennie as Dr. Pearson
 Constance Smith as Cora Laurent
 Françoise Rosay as Mrs. Gauthier
 Judith Evelyn as Sister Marie Corbin
 Guy Sorel as Robert Helier
 June Hedin as Rochelle Turner

Reception
Channel 4's review of the film praised the cinematography and music score: "The movie is redolent with atmosphere: Joseph LaShelle's photography accentuates the black and shadows, and there's dark shading too in Alex North's music. The film is dominated by death and melancholy, and by Françoise Rosay as the matriarch responsible for the trouble."

References

External links
 
 
 

1951 films
1950s mystery films
20th Century Fox films
American mystery films
American remakes of French films
American black-and-white films
1950s English-language films
Film noir
Films scored by Alex North
Films directed by Otto Preminger
Films set in Quebec
Henri-Georges Clouzot
1950s American films